Brettell Lane railway station was a station on the Oxford-Worcester-Wolverhampton Line which served the town of Brierley Hill in England.

History

It was opened in 1852 by the Oxford, Worcester and Wolverhampton Railway. Local coal mining and steel mills led to rapid industrialisation of the area and heavy usage of the station in the early 20th century, but numbers had declined badly by the 1960s.

In 1858, a coupling broke on an excursion train at the station and the rear portion rolled back down the gradient from Round Oak railway station towards Brettell Lane where it collided with another train (which was actually part of the same excursion, the train already having been safely divided once due to its extreme length) 14 passengers were killed and 50 more injured.

The line had reasonable passenger usage until about the early 1880s, when it began to slump at several stations, leading to the line becoming a largely freight only operation in 1887. It would remain open for goods traffic, which was considerable at this time, as the district had become highly industrialised in the then heyday of the Black Country's industrial past.

As the local industry declined and road transport became more common, the station entered a post-World War 2 decline.

British Rail closed the station pre-Beeching in 1962. Two railways/routes served the station - originally the OW&WR and the South Staffordshire Railway, which later became the Great Western Railway and London, Midland and Scottish Railway (through amalgamation of the London and North Western Railway) respectively.

Today's usage

Today, only freight trains pass through the former site of the station, for access to the now declining Moor Lane Goods Yard a few hundred yards away on its own spur line. The station has been largely built over with a factory and several warehouses on one side and fenced off on the other.

Its usage has declined further since the early 1990s, with the closure of the line between Round Oak and Walsall in 1993 and the branch to Pensnett a year later.

A signal box situated in the vicinity of the station was burnt down by arsonists in 2003, and was replaced by a ground frame.

Imagery of the station

Kingswinford Junction
Kingswinford Junction is a railway junction on the old Oxford-Worcester-Wolverhampton Line (OWW), which allows trains to diverge on to the Wombourne Branch Line. It is located north of Brettell Lane railway station, just before the line passes through Moor Lane Goods Yard.

History 
Both the OWW line and the Wombourne Branch Line were constructed, or overseen, by the Great Western Railway. The OWW line was a significant route between Stourbridge Junction and Wolverhampton Low Level while the Wombourne Branch was originally an important freight-only route bypassing the congested  railway routes through the West Midlands conurbation. Modifications to Kingswinford Junction, north of the station allowed passenger trains to traverse the Wombourne Branch Line for a short period between 1925 and 1932. The latter was host to passenger services for just seven years between 1925 and 1932, and the OWW closed pre-Beeching in 1962. The junction's use decreased sharply with the closure of the Wombourne Branch in 1965, although the line remained open as a link to the Pensnett Trading Estate until 1994.

Today's usage 
The junction remains since it also allows access to Moor Lane Goods Yard. Trains rarely use this yard and it would appear the junction's use is minimal, if used at all, except for the odd Network Rail maintenance train.

The former Moor Lane signal box 
The signal box that operated the junction was still used on a small scale until the late 1990s, when Moor Lane's usage heavily declined. It was burnt down by arsonists in 2003. A manually operated ground frame replaced the former relic of the West Midlands railways. This ground frame must be cleared for use by Stourbridge Junction's Middle Box.

Moor Lane Goods Yard
It was a once important goods yard that lay a few hundred yards from Brettell Lane railway station and across the tracks at Kingswinford Junction. Local coal mining and steel mills lead to rapid industrialisation of the area and heavy usage of the station in the early 20th century, but numbers had declined badly by the 1960s. The former carriage sidings and truck sidings are now out of use and current freight turnover is low and relates to a few nearby factories and warehouses.

History
It opened in 1852, to serve the local town and later took on transport significance with the nearby coal mines at the Delph/Amblecote pits, Amblecote Bank, not far from the Stourbridge Canal near Brettell Lane railway station.

Today's usage
It is now owned by the DB Cargo UK freight company and is occasionally used by themselves and Network Rail.

Imagery of the goods yard

Future

Phase 2 of the West Midlands Metro would have seen the station become part of the local tram network with the line reopening between Walsall and Stourbridge, via Dudley Port railway station, Dudley railway station and the Merry Hill Shopping Centre for trams which will share the line with freight trains. In March 2011, the business plan for the reopening of the line between Stourbridge and Walsall was submitted to Network Rail.

In 2019, PMOL (the operators of the Stourbridge Shuttle) announced plans for the creation of the Dudley and Stourbridge Light Railway, using similar Parry People Mover Trains to operate a service from the Waterfront to Stourbridge Junction via Brierley Hill and Stourbridge Town. This would see the northern end of the line creating a tram interchange with services to Dudley, Wolverhampton and Birmingham, whilst the southern end of the line will create a direct link to National Rail services. A feasibility study is currently being undertaken.

See also
 Brierley Hill
 Stourbridge Junction railway station
 South Staffordshire Line
Dudley Freightliner Terminal
Round Oak Steel Terminal

References

Further reading

External links
Some South Staffordshire Railway Byways – The Darlaston Branch
A History of Wednesbury - Roads, Canals, and Railways

Rail transport in Dudley
Disused railway stations in Dudley
Former Great Western Railway stations
Railway stations in Great Britain opened in 1852
Railway stations in Great Britain closed in 1962
Buildings and structures in the United Kingdom destroyed by arson
1852 establishments in England